Teresa Isabel Leger Fernandez (born July 1, 1959) is an American attorney and politician representing New Mexico's 3rd congressional district in the United States House of Representatives.

Early life and education 
Leger Fernandez was born in Las Vegas, New Mexico. Her mother, Mela Leger, was a bilingual educator and her father, Ray Leger, served as a member of the New Mexico Senate. After graduating from West Las Vegas High School, Leger Fernandez earned a Bachelor of Arts degree from Yale University and a Juris Doctor from Stanford Law School.

Career 
After graduating from law school, Leger Fernandez returned to New Mexico to work as an attorney, specializing in community-building and tribal advocacy. She was a White House Fellow during the Clinton Administration and later served on the Advisory Council on Historic Preservation during the Obama Administration. She also worked as a liaison between the White House Office and the Department of Housing and Urban Development. For 30 years, Leger Fernandez has operated Leger Law and Strategy, LLC in Santa Fe. The firm focuses on community development, tribal advocacy, civil rights, and social justice. In 2017, she led a successful effort to implement ranked-choice voting in Santa Fe's municipal elections.

U.S. House of Representatives

Elections

2020 

After incumbent Representative Ben Ray Luján announced that he would not seek reelection in 2020 and instead run for the United States Senate seat being vacated by Tom Udall, Leger Fernandez announced her candidacy to succeed Luján. In the Democratic primary, Leger Fernandez faced six opponents, including New Mexico State Representative Joseph L. Sanchez and Valerie Plame, an author and former CIA officer.  During the campaign, Leger Fernandez was endorsed by Congresswoman Deb Haaland, EMILY's List, and The Santa Fe New Mexican.

A political progressive, Leger Fernandez was also endorsed by the Working Families Party, Elizabeth Warren, and Alexandria Ocasio-Cortez. She placed first in the primary with over 42% of the vote.

In the November general election, Leger Fernandez defeated Republican nominee Alexis Johnson. She assumed office on January 3, 2021.

Tenure

Committee assignments 

 Committee on Natural Resources
 Subcommittee on Indigenous Peoples, Chair
 Subcommittee on National Parks, Forests and Public Lands
 Committee on Education and Labor
 Subcommittee on Higher Education and Workforce Investment
 Subcommittee on Civil Rights and Human Services
 Committee on Administration
 Subcommittee on Elections

Caucus membership 

 Congressional Progressive Caucus

Political positions 
Leger Fernandez has advocated a "New Mexico Green New Deal", Medicare for All, a transition from fracking to green energy, and a ban on the sale of military-style semi-automatic rifles. She has also supported comprehensive immigration reform and the DREAM Act.

Personal life 
Leger Fernandez and her ex-husband, Luis Fernandez, have three sons.

See also
List of Hispanic and Latino Americans in the United States Congress
Women in the United States House of Representatives

References

External links 

 Representative Teresa Leger Fernandez official U.S. House website
 Campaign website

 

|-

1959 births
Living people
Democratic Party members of the United States House of Representatives from New Mexico
Female members of the United States House of Representatives
Hispanic and Latino American members of the United States Congress
New Mexico lawyers
People from Las Vegas, New Mexico
San Miguel County, New Mexico
Stanford Law School alumni
Yale University alumni
Women in New Mexico politics
21st-century American women